Dennis Gordon Patterson (born January 9, 1950) is a Canadian former professional ice hockey defenceman who played in the National Hockey League, World Hockey Association, and American Hockey League.

Early life 
Patterson was born in Peterborough, Ontario. He played minor ice hockey in Peterborough and went to the 1962 Quebec International Pee-Wee Hockey Tournament with his youth team.

Career 
Patterson played three seasons in the National Hockey League (NHL) for the Kansas City Scouts and Philadelphia Flyers and one season in the World Hockey Association (WHA) for the Edmonton Oilers between 1974 and 1980. The rest of his career, which lasted from 1970 to 1983, was spent in the minor leagues, mainly the American Hockey League. He is currently a scout for the Flyers.

Career statistics

Regular season and playoffs

References

External links
 

1950 births
Baltimore Clippers players
Canadian expatriate ice hockey players in the United States
Canadian ice hockey defencemen
Cleveland Barons (1937–1973) players
Clinton Comets players
Edmonton Oilers (WHA) players
Florida Panthers scouts
Kansas City Scouts players
Living people
Maine Mariners players
Minnesota North Stars draft picks
Minnesota North Stars scouts
New Haven Nighthawks players
Peterborough Petes (ice hockey) players
Philadelphia Flyers players
Philadelphia Flyers scouts
Rhode Island Reds players
Springfield Indians players